Calloruza is a monotypic moth genus of the family Noctuidae erected by George Hampson in 1918. Its only species, Calloruza pulchra, was first described by George Thomas Bethune-Baker in 1906. It is found in New Guinea.

References

Acontiinae